Visa requirements for Spanish citizens are administrative entry restrictions by the authorities of other states placed on citizens of Spain. As of July 2022, Spanish citizens had visa-free or visa on arrival access to 190 (of 193 as the maximum) countries and territories, ranking the ordinary Spanish passport 3rd in terms of travel freedom according to the Henley Passport Index.

Visa requirements map

Visa requirements 

This table documents the situation prior to Travel restrictions related to the COVID-19 pandemic.

Territories and disputed areas
Visa requirements for Spanish citizens for visits to various territories, disputed areas, partially recognized countries and restricted zones:

ID Card or Passport
 Spanish ID card ((Documento nacional de identidad) is valid for these countries :
Due to Freedom of Movement in European Union / Schengen Area:

For Tourism with ID Card or Passport is also valid for traveling in these countries:

ID Card or Passport is valid for 90 days of visit in (Albania), (Andorra), (Bosnia and Herzegovina), (Kosovo), (Monaco), (Moldova), (North Macedonia), (Northern Cyprus), (Serbia), (San Marino), (Turkey) and (Vatican City).

(Georgia) ID Card or Passport is valid for 1 year of visit.

(Montenegro) ID Card is valid for 30 days of visit, or with Passport for 90 days of visit.

1 – (Egypt) ID Card or Passport is valid for 30 days of visit, {evisa} or {visa on arrival}.

2 – (Tunisia) ID Card is valid on an Organized Tours visit only, or with Passport – {Visa not Required} is valid for 90 days of visit.

(Jordan) ID Card is valid on an Organized Tours visit or with Passport – {visa on arrival} is valid for 30 days of visit.

Remote work visas
Spanish citizens can apply for a resident permit on the basis of a remote worker from the following countries:

Working holiday agreement
Spanish citizens aged 18–30 (or 18–35 in some cases) can apply for a resident permit on the basis of a working holiday from the following countries:

Vaccination
Many African countries, including Angola, Benin, Burkina Faso, Cameroon, Central African Republic, Chad, Democratic Republic of the Congo, Republic of the Congo, Côte d'Ivoire, Equatorial Guinea, Gabon, Ghana, Guinea, Liberia, Mali, Mauritania, Niger, Rwanda, São Tomé and Príncipe, Senegal, Sierra Leone, Uganda, Zambia require all incoming passengers to have a current International Certificate of Vaccination. Some other countries require vaccination only if the passenger is coming from an infected area.

Israeli stamps

Fingerprinting
Several countries including Argentina, Cambodia, Colombia,  Japan, Malaysia, Saudi Arabia, South Korea and the United States demand all passengers to be fingerprinted on arrival.

Right to consular protection in non-EU countries

In a non-EU country where there is no Spanish embassy, Spanish citizens, like all other EU citizens, have the right to get consular protection from the embassy of any other EU country present in that country.

See also List of diplomatic missions of Spain.

Passport validity
Many countries require passports to be valid for at least 6 months upon arrival and one or two blank pages. Countries requiring passports to be validity at least 6 months on arrival include Afghanistan, Algeria, Bhutan, Botswana, Brunei, Cambodia,  Comoros, Côte d'Ivoire, Ecuador, Egypt, El Salvador, Fiji, Guyana, Indonesia, Iran, Iraq (except when arriving at Basra – 3 months and Erbil or Sulaimaniyah – on arrival), Israel, Kenya, Laos, Madagascar, Malaysia, Marshall Islands, Myanmar, Namibia, Nicaragua, Nigeria, Oman, Palau, Papua New Guinea, Philippines, Rwanda, Saint Lucia, Samoa, Saudi Arabia, Singapore, Solomon Islands, Sri Lanka, Suriname, Taiwan, Tanzania, Timor-Leste, Tonga, Tuvalu, Uganda, Vanuatu, Venezuela, Vietnam, countries requiring passport validity of at least 4 months on arrival include Micronesia, Zambia, countries requiring passport validity of at least 3 months on arrival include Georgia, Honduras, Iceland, Jordan, Kuwait, Lebanon, Moldova, Nauru, Panama, United Arab Emirates and countries requiring passport validity of at least 1 month on arrival include Eritrea, Hong Kong, Macao, New Zealand, South Africa. Other countries require either a passport valid on arrival or passport valid throughout the period of intended stay.

Non-ordinary passports

Holders of various categories of official Spanish passports have additional visa-free access to the following countries – Algeria (diplomatic or service passports), Egypt (diplomatic, official, service or special passports), Kazakhstan (diplomatic passports), Kuwait (diplomatic passports), Russia (diplomatic passports), Turkey (diplomatic, official, service or special passports) and Vietnam (diplomatic passports). Holders of diplomatic or service passports of any country have visa-free access to Cape Verde, Ethiopia, Mali and Zimbabwe.

See also

 Visa requirements for European Union citizens
 Visa policy of the Schengen Area
 Foreign relations of Spain

References and notes
References

Notes

Spain
Foreign relations of Spain